Joseph Lawrence Zanussi (born September 25, 1947) is a Canadian former professional ice hockey player who played 149 games in the World Hockey Association and 87 games in the National Hockey League. Zanussi's skating ability and agility earned him the nicknames 'Crazy Legs' and 'Tazmanian Devil' and although small for a pro hockey defenseman, Zanussi was a good bodychecker and possessed a big shot.

Joe Zanussi began his hockey career where Rossland was able to field a BC Juvenile Finalist Team in 1964-65. Detroit's Chief Western Scout, Clarence Moher noticed Joe at the finals and invited him to the Edmonton Oil Kings Rookie camp in 1965-66. He spent this season with the Oil Kings Jr. B Red Wings. In the off-season of 67/68 Joe was traded to the Swift Current Broncos of the WCJHL and became their first League Captain. This season he made the league's second All Star Team and was picked up by the Flin Flon Bombers to contend for the Memorial Cup against the Niagara Falls Flyers.

Although Joe's hockey rights were owned by the Detroit Red Wings, he subsequently went to training camp and was assigned to the Johnstown Jets of the EHL. After surviving his toughest year in hockey Joe led his defensive corps in scoring in which he produced 56 points on 20 goals & 36 assists. He finally turned Pro Hockey in 1969-70 and played with the Fort Worth Wings of the CPHL. His second year in Fort Worth earned him a tie for the League's MVP award and a place on the 2nd All Star Team. On awards night he also acquired the Sportsmanship and Best Defenseman Awards. The following year, 1971–72, a knee surgery caused Joe's career to be put on hold, but he was eventually drafted by the Winnipeg Jets of the WHL. The Winnipeg Jets played for the Leagues Avco Cup Final in its inaugural year. The team and league took shape in 1973-74 and Joe, alias "Tasmanian Devil", finished off the season by being voted Most Exciting Player by Winnipeg Jets Fans. Joe's 3-year contract was then cut short, and his NHL rights were then owned by the New York Rangers by way of a trade with Detroit.

After the 1974-75 training camp Joe was designated to Providence Rhode Island Reds of the AHL. This year was a highlight year as he was called to the Rangers on numerous occasions. Ending the year Joe was the recipient of the “Eddie Shore Award” which is for being the League's Best Defenseman. This same season he was selected to the 1st All Star Team, and was runner up to the League's MVP Award. Joe obtained team honors that included MVP and Best Defenseman.

Joe Zanussi's only hockey card noted that he had a big smile. He signed originally with the Detroit Red Wings and played with the New York Rangers, Winnipeg Jets, St. Louis Blues, and Boston Bruins.  He was part of the 1975 "Biggest Trade In Hockey History"  which brought Phil Esposito to the Rangers and sent Brad Park and Jean Ratelle to the Bruins. When the trade occurred, Joe was the leading scorer in the American Hockey League. Zanussi scored his only NHL goal while with the Bruins.  It occurred on February 1, 1976 in Boston's 5-3 home win over the Atlanta Flames. The coming year proved to be very unsettling and a year of many moves. Joe went from Boston to Rochester (A.H.L.) then back to Boston and after a trade at Christmas he was sent to the St. Louis Blues then on to the Kansas City Blues of the Central Hockey League. This team took top honors and eventually won the Adams Cup (Central League Championship). Joe attended one more training camp with the St. Louis Blues but was assigned to the Salt Lake Golden Eagles of the Central Hockey League. He was voted to the League's 1st All Star Team and received the team's Best Defenseman Award. Zanussi led the AHL in scoring at the time, with 19 points through 11 games.

Career highlights
1967-68: 1st league captain of the Swift Current Broncos of the Western Canadian Junior Hockey League; WCJHL Second All-Star Team; member of the 1968 Estevan Bruins, 1968 Memorial Cup Champions.

1970-71: CHL MVP (tie); CHL 2nd team all star; team sportsmanship award; CHL best defenseman.

1972-73: Assisted on first ever Winnipeg Jets regular season WHA goal.

1973-74: Winnipeg Jets most exciting player as voted by the fans.

1974-75: Eddie Shore Award (AHL Best Defenseman); MVP Runner Up; 1st team all star; Providence Reds team MVP and Defensive awards.

1977-78: CHL 1st team all star; Salt Lake Golden Eagles best defenseman.

Trades
May 24, 1972: Traded to the New York Rangers by the Detroit Red Wings along with the Red Wings first round choice in the 1972 draft (#10 overall, Rangers selected Al Blanchard) in exchange for Gary Doak and Rick Newell.

Nov. 7, 1975: Traded to the Boston Bruins by the New York Rangers along with Jean Ratelle and Brad Park in exchange for Phil Esposito and Carol Vadnais.

Dec. 20, 1976: Traded to the St. Louis Blues by the Boston Bruins in exchange for Rick Smith.

Career statistics

References

External links
 https://scbroncos.com/hall-of-fame/
 https://www.hockeydb.com/ihdb/stats/pdisplay.php?pid=5849

1947 births
Boston Bruins players
Canadian ice hockey defencemen
Fort Worth Wings players
Ice hockey people from British Columbia
Johnstown Jets players
Kansas City Blues players
Living people
New York Rangers players
People from Rossland, British Columbia
Providence Reds players
Rochester Americans players
St. Louis Blues players
Salt Lake Golden Eagles (CHL) players
Swift Current Broncos players
Undrafted National Hockey League players
Winnipeg Jets (WHA) players
Canadian expatriate ice hockey players in the United States